Anthony Tognazzini is an American short story writer.

Biography
Anthony Tognazzini was born in 1969 in Orange, California. He is a Californio, descended from the Carrillo family which includes the Mexican Governor of Alta California, Carlos Antonio Carrillo. Tognazzini grew up in a military family in the Philippines, Spain, Texas, and California. He graduated from University of California, Santa Cruz and Indiana University Bloomington, and has taught at New York University, College of Wooster, and The New School.

He is the author of a collection of short fiction, I Carry A Hammer In My Pocket For Occasions Such As These, published in 2007 by BOA. A review of the collection in Bomb (magazine) said, "Tognazzini deconstructs universal moments with language, revealing underlying beauty and bliss." His work has appeared in Electric Literature, TriQuarterly, Guernica (magazine), and Crazyhorse (magazine).

About his writing and politics, Tognazzini has said: "Agenda-driven writing is to be avoided, in my view, but we’re also living in a socio-political moment that needs the attention of every sensitive, awake individual. I considered myself apolitical when I was younger, but that’s just ignorant and foolish, especially for a writer. There’s no such thing as apolitical writing."

His short story "Neighbors," published by Electric Literature, was chosen for Selected Shorts and performed by actors Michael Imperioli and Cristin Milioti at Symphony Space in New York City in April 2017. The recording was distributed to radio stations through Public Radio International.

He lives in Ohio.

Awards
 Ohio Arts Council - Individual Excellence Award
 Yaddo
 Djerassi Resident Artists Program
 Virginia Center for the Creative Arts Fellowship
 Millay Colony for the Arts Fellowship

Published works
I Carry A Hammer In My Pocket For Occasions Such As These (BOA 2007)
"Thugs" in Guernica, Fall 2015
"Neighbors"in Electric Literature, Summer 2015
"Have You Heard Anything? in Guernica, Winter 2012
"The Treehouse" in TriQuarterly, Summer 2012

Anthologies

Interviews
"There Is No Such Thing as Apolitical Writing: an Interview with Anthony Tognazzini" in Electric Literature, Summer 2015
"2 + 2 can = Cake: A Conversation with Dean Young and Anthony Tognazzini" in Bomb, Fall 2012

References

External links
Official Homepage
Anthony Tognazzini at The College of Wooster 
"Neighbors" performed by Michael Imperioli and Cristin Milioti for Selected Shorts

1969 births
Living people
American academics of English literature
American male short story writers
21st-century American short story writers
21st-century American male writers
University of California, Santa Cruz alumni
Indiana University alumni
21st-century American non-fiction writers
American male non-fiction writers